Pagham Harbour is a  biological and geological Site of Special Scientific Interest on the western outskirts of Bognor Regis in West Sussex. It is a Geological Conservation Review site, a Nature Conservation Review site, a Ramsar site,  a Special Protection Area and a Marine Conservation Zone.

The harbour forms an area of saltmarsh and shallow lagoons. It is not an estuary, as no major streams enter the harbour with the only freshwater inflow a few small streams draining surrounding fields.

History
In earlier times Pagham Harbour was a working harbour with three ports. One port was situated at the western end, of the harbour near Sidlesham Mill, and was  known as Wardur. The port of Charlton was at the entrance to the harbour and the third was on the Pagham side of the harbour and was known as the Port of Wythering (Wyderinges). 

The port of Wardur was part of 'New Haven' a development in the Middle Ages. The Port of Wythering was overrun by the sea in the 13th century and the whole harbour eventually silted up and ceased to be navigable, except for small craft.

An attempt was made to drain the harbour for farming in c. 1873 with an embankment constructed across the edge of the lagoon to hold back the sea; this failed during a storm in December 1910 and was not reconstructed. 

At present the entrance to the sea is 50 metres wide.

Pagham Harbour today
Pagham Harbour  today, is one of the  few undeveloped stretches of the Sussex coast. It has a sheltered inlet. The harbour is designated as a nature reserve  and is an internationally important wetland site for wildlife. The Reserve is made up of saltmarsh and tidal mudflats with shingle, open water, reed swamp and wet permanent grassland habitats.

Notes

References

External links 
RSPB information on site.
Special Protection Area designation
Pagham Harbour photos and information

Arun District
Environment of West Sussex
Geological Conservation Review sites
Local Nature Reserves in West Sussex
Nature Conservation Review sites
Ports and harbours of West Sussex
Ramsar sites in England
Sites of Special Scientific Interest in West Sussex
Special Protection Areas in England